The Wolf of Wall Street may refer to:
 The Wolf of Wall Street (book), the 2007 memoir of Jordan Belfort, who was himself nicknamed the Wolf of Wall Street
 The Wolf of Wall Street (2013 film), a film by Martin Scorsese based on Belfort's memoir
 The Wolf of Wall Street (1929 film), a silent film by Rowland V. Lee and starring George Bancroft
 David Lamar (1876–1934), con man known as "The Wolf of Wall Street"

See also
 Wolves of Wall Street, a 2002 film by David DeCoteau
 The Lone Wolf of Wall Street, nickname of Bernard Baruch (1870–1965), American financier, stock investor and philanthropist
 Wall Street (disambiguation)